Loris Sven Karius (born 22 June 1993) is a German professional footballer who plays as a goalkeeper for Premier League club Newcastle United.

Born in Biberach, Karius began his career with Stuttgart before moving to Manchester City in 2009. After two years in Manchester City's youth system, he returned to Germany with Mainz 05. He established himself as the first-choice goalkeeper for the Bundesliga side before transferring to Liverpool in 2016 for a fee of £4.75 million. Karius would go on to play in the 2018 UEFA Champions League final with the club, a 3–1 defeat to Real Madrid. After loan spells at Beşiktaş and Union Berlin, he left Liverpool in 2022 and joined Newcastle United.

Karius represented Germany at youth level.

Early life
Karius was born in Biberach, Baden-Württemberg to Christine and Harald Karius. Harald intended for his son to become a motocross rider, but Loris' grandfather, Karl, encouraged him to focus on football.

Karius attended Pestalozzi-Gymnasium Biberach until his move to England in 2009 where he was then privately tutored.

Club career

Early career
Karius played for local team SG Mettenberg and SSV Ulm 1846 before joining VfB Stuttgart, where he rose through the youth ranks and appeared for the German under-16 national team against Macedonia in September 2008.

Manchester City
Manchester City invited Karius and his family to England after watching him in Germany's under-16 game against Azerbaijan, and completed his signing on 1 July 2009. Karius played for the under-18 and the under-21 Manchester City teams, but did not make a senior appearance during his time in Manchester.

Mainz 05

Manchester City loaned Karius to Mainz 05 in August 2011, where he played for Mainz 05's reserve team, Mainz 05 II, in the Regionalliga. On 11 January 2012, the move was made permanent with Karius committing himself to a two-year deal with an option for a third year that would extend his contract to June 2015.

He made his Mainz 05 debut on 1 December 2012 in a Bundesliga match against Hannover 96 when he was substituted for Shawn Parker after goalkeeper Christian Wetklo had been sent off, which, aged 19 years and 5 months, made Karius the youngest goalkeeper ever to play in the Bundesliga for Mainz. He made no further appearances in the 2012–13 season, but established himself as first-choice goalkeeper in the 2013–14 season and on 12 January 2015 signed a three-year contract extension.

Karius was ever-present in the 2015–16 season, keeping nine clean sheets, saving two penalties and being voted the second-best goalkeeper in the league in a poll of 235 fellow Bundesliga players, ranking behind only Manuel Neuer.

Liverpool

On 24 May 2016, Karius signed with Liverpool for a fee of £4.75 million on a five-year deal. He was given the number 1 jersey.

2016–17 season 
He made his debut in a 3–0 EFL Cup win over Derby County on 20 September 2016. He played his first Premier League match against Hull City, which ended in a 5–1 victory for the Reds, on 24 September. He kept his first Premier League clean sheet on 17 October in a 0–0 draw with rivals Manchester United. On 24 October 2016, Jürgen Klopp confirmed that Karius was Liverpool's first-choice goalkeeper, ahead of Simon Mignolet. After two sub-par performances in early December, which included spilling Lewis Cook's tame shot into the path of Nathan Aké to tap home into an empty net to give Bournemouth a 4–3 win, Karius was dropped from the starting eleven. Regarding this decision, Klopp stated he wanted to take Karius "out the firing line," and that "Karius is a young goalkeeper. He will bounce back."

2017–18 season 
In the 2018 Champions League quarter-final 2nd leg at Manchester City, with the aggregate scoreline at 3–1 to Liverpool, Karius was involved in a controversial incident when he failed to clear a cross into the penalty area, punching the ball down which ricocheted off teammate James Milner and into the path of Man City winger Leroy Sané who scored, only for the linesman to give offside. In the Champions League semi-final home leg against AS Roma, with the scoreline at 0–0, Karius let Aleksandar Kolarov's shot go through his hands with the ball then hitting the crossbar, before Liverpool went on to win 5–2. In the away game in Rome, Karius was involved in controversy when he came rushing out of his goal and brought down Edin Džeko inside the penalty area, but instead of a penalty and red card the linesman gave offside in what The Telegraph called "an extremely tight call". Minutes later Karius parried a Roma shot into the path of Džeko which levelled the score for Roma at 2–2, before the game finished 4–2 to Roma and 7–6 to Liverpool on aggregate.

Karius started for Liverpool against Real Madrid in the 2018 UEFA Champions League Final which Liverpool lost 3–1. He was deemed at fault for two of the goals that Liverpool conceded, the first and third: the first when his throw was blocked by Karim Benzema and deflected into the net; the second when he mishandled Gareth Bale's 40-yard strike.

After the match, he wept and tearfully apologised to Liverpool fans who remained in the stands. He also stated that his mistakes "lost the team the final". After the match, Karius received online death threats, mainly on Twitter, which prompted Merseyside Police to launch an investigation. Five days later, Karius underwent an examination at Massachusetts General Hospital. Medics concluded he had suffered a concussion from an elbow to his head, reportedly from Sergio Ramos just minutes before his first mistake. Doctors, however, did not pinpoint the exact moment he was concussed. According to doctor Ross Zafonte, it was possible the concussion affected his performance. Later, on 6 July, at the start of pre season, Klopp stated that Karius was "100% influenced by his concussion", leading to his errors, with Klopp saying "We don't use it as an excuse, we use it as an explanation. For me, it's 100% the explanation [for his performance]. He was influenced by that knock – that is 100%".

2018–19 season 
In July 2018, Liverpool broke the world transfer fee record for a goalkeeper when they signed Alisson Becker for an initial fee of €62.5 million (£56m), potentially rising to €72 million (£66.8 million) with performance-based bonuses. The signing effectively relegated Karius to a backup role.

Loan to Beşiktaş 
On 25 August 2018, Karius joined Turkish club Beşiktaş on a two-year loan move. On 8 December 2018, he made several saves against Alanyaspor in a scoreless draw.

In March 2019, he sought legal action against Beşiktaş for back payment of four months' wages which he alleged the club had failed to pay him. On 4 May 2020, Karius terminated his contract with the Turkish outfit due to continuing issues regarding unpaid wages and after completing the majority of the two years agreed.

Loan to Union Berlin 
On 28 September 2020, Karius was loaned to German side Union Berlin for the 2020–21 season. On 22 December 2020, Karius made his debut in a 3–2 defeat against SC Paderborn in the German DFB Pokal. On 13 February 2021, he made his first start in the Bundesliga for Union Berlin in a goalless draw against Schalke.

Return to Liverpool 
In July 2021, Karius returned to Liverpool. However, manager Jürgen Klopp stated in January 2022 that Karius would not be included in the squad; he made no further official appearances for the club until the end of his contract. It was confirmed in June that Karius would leave the club when his contract expired at the end of the month.

Newcastle United 
On 12 September 2022, Karius signed for Newcastle United on an initial contract until January 2023, which was later extended until the end of the season.

On 26 February, despite having not made a prior appearance for Newcastle, Karius made his debut for the club in the 2023 EFL Cup final in a 2–0 loss against Manchester United. This appearance came about due to first-choice Nick Pope receiving a red card against Liverpool on 18 February, and backup Martin Dúbravka being cup-tied having appeared for Newcastle's Cup final opponent earlier in the season whilst on loan. The match was Karius's first in two years and his first for an English club since the 2018 UEFA Champions League final. Despite the result, Karius was praised for his performance, making eight saves during the contest.

International career
Karius represented Germany at all youth levels from under-16 onward, but his appearances were limited due to competition from other goalkeepers.

Career statistics

Honours
Liverpool
UEFA Champions League runner-up: 2017–18

Newcastle United
EFL Cup runner-up: 2022–23

References

External links

Profile at the Newcastle United F.C. website

1993 births
Living people
People from Biberach an der Riss
Sportspeople from Tübingen (region)
Footballers from Baden-Württemberg
German footballers
Germany youth international footballers
Germany under-21 international footballers
Association football goalkeepers
Manchester City F.C. players
1. FSV Mainz 05 II players
1. FSV Mainz 05 players
Liverpool F.C. players
Beşiktaş J.K. footballers
1. FC Union Berlin players
Newcastle United F.C. players
Bundesliga players
Premier League players
Süper Lig players
German expatriate footballers
Expatriate footballers in England
Expatriate footballers in Turkey
German expatriate sportspeople in England
German expatriate sportspeople in Turkey